Cedric Rupert Hay (27 September 1880 – 8 November 1953) was an Australian rules footballer who played with Melbourne in the Victorian Football League (VFL).

Family
His brother, Harold Dudley Hay (1881–1955), also played VFL football for Melbourne.

Football

Melbourne (VFL)
His single game for Melbourne's First XVIII was against Carlton, at Princes Park, on 18 August 1900.

"Heritage number"
Hay has been given the Melbourne Heritage Number of 82 (his brother, Harold, has 81), based on the order of his debut for the club.

Notes

External links 

 Cedric Hay, at Demonwiki.

1880 births
Australian rules footballers from Melbourne
Melbourne Football Club players
1953 deaths
People from St Kilda, Victoria